The Supreme Soviet of the Georgian SSR (sakartvelos ssr-is umaghlesi sabch’o) was the supreme soviet (main legislative institution) of the Georgian SSR from 1938 to 1990.

History 
The Supreme Soviet of the Georgian SSR was preceded by the All-Georgian Congress of Soviets which operated from 1922 to 1937. The Supreme Soviet was a unicameral institution and it consisted of 250 deputies (440 deputies before 1990). Deputies served five-year terms, but this was changed to four-year terms in 1978. The first multiparty elections were held on October 28, 1990 during the 1990 Georgian Supreme Soviet election. This was the first time that the Supreme Soviet of the Georgian SSR began to exercise state power. For most of its history, the Supreme Soviet of the Georgian SSR was dominated by the Communist Party of the Soviet Union and the Communist Party of Georgia.

Convocations 

 1st Convocation (1938-1946)
 2nd Convocation (1947-1950)
 3rd Convocation (1951-1954)
 4th Convocation (1955-1959)
 5th Convocation (1959-1962)
 6th Convocation (1963-1966)
 7th Convocation (1967-1970)
 8th Convocation (1971-1974)
 9th Convocation (1975-1979)
 10th Convocation (1980-1984)
 11th Convocation (1985-1989)
 12th Convocation (1990-1992), as the Supreme Council of the Republic of Georgia

Chairmen of the Supreme Soviet

Chairmen of the Presidium of the Supreme Soviet

See also 

 Supreme Soviet of the Soviet Union
 Supreme Soviet
 Georgian SSR

References 

Historical legislatures
1938 establishments in Georgia (country)
1990 disestablishments in Georgia (country)
Government of the Soviet Union
Government of Georgia (country)
Georgian Soviet Socialist Republic
Defunct unicameral legislatures
Georgian